Ayodeji Opeyemi "Yemi" Abiodun (born 29 December 1980) is an English retired professional footballer who played as a striker.

Career
Born in London, Abiodun played youth football with Millwall and Norwich City. He signed a professional contract with Southend United in June 1999, making his first team debut in August 1999. Abiodun left Southend in January 2001, having made three league appearances for the side. Abiodun had short spells with a number of non-league clubs, including Chesham United, Harrow Borough, Dulwich Hamlet, Enfield, Maidenhead United, Welling United, Ford United and Hampton & Richmond Borough.

References

1980 births
Living people
English footballers
Black British sportsmen
Millwall F.C. players
Norwich City F.C. players
Southend United F.C. players
Chesham United F.C. players
Harrow Borough F.C. players
Dulwich Hamlet F.C. players
Enfield F.C. players
Maidenhead United F.C. players
Hampton & Richmond Borough F.C. players
Welling United F.C. players
Redbridge F.C. players
English Football League players
People from Upper Clapton
Footballers from the London Borough of Hackney
Association football forwards